Bonkers! is a British television variety show from ATV, and distributed by ITC Entertainment in the United States for syndication during the 1978–79 television season. The show aired later in 1979 on ITV in the United Kingdom. A total of 24 episodes were produced. The show was filmed at ATV's Elstree studios near London.

Starring Bob Monkhouse and the Hudson Brothers – Bill, Brett and Mark – the show featured sketches, guest stars and musical numbers from the chorus dancers known as The Bonkerettes. While not a big hit for ATV, it gained a cult audience in the United States where it was compared to Saturday Night Live.

After four episodes the show was curtailed in the United Kingdom by the 13-week-long ITV strike of 1979. When ITV returned only a small number of companies mainly Border Television, ATV, Granada and UTV broadcast a few additional episodes, however the series was not fully broadcast in the United Kingdom.

References

External links
 Comedy Guide – Bonkers! at bbc.co.uk
 

1970s British television series
1978 British television series debuts
1979 British television series endings
British variety television shows
English-language television shows
Television shows produced by Associated Television (ATV)
Television series by ITC Entertainment
Television shows shot at ATV Elstree Studios